Crossgates may refer to:

Cross Gates, Leeds, an area in the east of the city
Crossgates, Cumbria, England
Crossgates, Scarborough, North Yorkshire, England
Crossgates, Fife, a village in Scotland
Crossgates, Powys, a village in Wales
Crossgates Commons, a shopping plaza in New York, United States
Crossgates Mall, a shopping mall in New York, United States

See also
Crossgate (disambiguation)